Counter Admiral Aristide Louis Antoine Vallon (July 26, 1826 – March 11, 1897) was born in Le Conquet. He became Commandeur of the Légion d'honneur on January 18, 1881, and was appointed Governor of Senegal the following year. After serving in this position, he became Deputy of Senegal and subsequently Deputy of Brest, France. He died in Paris and was buried in Mirepoix, Ariège.

References

1826 births
1897 deaths
Colonial Governors of French Sénégal
Commandeurs of the Légion d'honneur